UFC Fight Night: Dern vs. Rodriguez (also known as UFC Fight Night 194, UFC Vegas 39 and UFC on ESPN+ 52) was a mixed martial arts event produced by the Ultimate Fighting Championship that took place on October 9, 2021 at the UFC Apex facility in Enterprise, Nevada, part of the Las Vegas Metropolitan Area, United States.

Background
A women's strawweight bout between Marina Rodriguez and Mackenzie Dern headlined the event.

A middleweight bout between Phil Hawes and Deron Winn was expected to take place at the event. The pairing was initially scheduled to meet on July 17 at UFC on ESPN: Makhachev vs. Moisés, but Winn pulled out of that event citing a chest injury. In turn, Winn withdrew the day before the event due to health issues. He was briefly replaced by Chris Curtis, but Hawes declined the bout and it was ultimately scrapped.

Michael Trizano and Chas Skelly were scheduled to meet in a featherweight bout at the event. However, Skelly was removed from the bout two weeks before the event due to undisclosed reasons. As a result, the bout was canceled.

A middleweight bout between Jamie Pickett and Laureano Staropoli was originally scheduled for this event. However, the bout was moved to UFC Fight Night: Costa vs. Vettori after one of Pickett's coaches tested positive for COVID-19.

Sam Hughes was expected to face Lupita Godinez in a women's strawweight bout at this event. However, Hughes was pulled from the bout after testing positive for COVID-19 and was replaced by promotional newcomer Silvana Gómez Juárez.

At the weigh-ins, Jared Gooden weighed in at 174 pounds, three pounds over the welterweight non-title fight limit. His bout proceeded at a catchweight and he forfeited 20% of his purse to his opponent Randy Brown.

Results

Bonus awards
The following fighters received $50,000 bonuses.
 Fight of the Night: Marina Rodriguez vs. Mackenzie Dern 
 Performance of the Night: Lupita Godinez and Mariya Agapova

See also 

 List of UFC events
 List of current UFC fighters
 2021 in UFC

References 

UFC Fight Night
2021 in mixed martial arts
October 2021 sports events in the United States
2021 in sports in Nevada
Mixed martial arts in Las Vegas
Sports competitions in Las Vegas